The England national cricket team, organised by Marylebone Cricket Club (MCC), toured India, Pakistan and Ceylon from October 1961 to February 1962. They played five Test matches against the India national cricket team, with India winning two matches and the other three being drawn; and three Tests against the Pakistan national cricket team, with England winning the first match and the other two drawn. The itinerary was unusual in that England began in Pakistan with three matches, including the first Test at the Gaddafi Stadium in Lahore, and then went on an extensive five-Test tour of India before crossing into East Pakistan (now Bangladesh), where they played their second Test against Pakistan at the Dacca Stadium in Dacca. For the third Test against Pakistan, they travelled to the National Stadium, Karachi before completing the tour in February with three games in Ceylon. Ceylon (now Sri Lanka) was not a Test-qualified team at that time and played a single first-class match against MCC in Colombo which was won by MCC.

Test matches in India

1st Test

2nd Test

3rd Test

4th Test

5th Test

Test matches in Pakistan
England played three Tests against Pakistan in a split series, the first match being played in October 1961 and the latter two in the new year following the tour of India. England won the first and the other two were drawn. England were captained by Ted Dexter and Pakistan by Imtiaz Ahmed. After this, England would not win another test series in Pakistan for 39 years.

1st Test

2nd Test

3rd Test

Ceylon
MCC won their first-class fixture in Colombo by 8 wickets. Ted Dexter captained MCC and Ceylon were led by Ievers Gunasekara.

References

External links
 England in India: Nov 1961/Jan 1962 at Cricinfo
 England in Pakistan, 1961-62 at Cricinfo
 England to India & Pakistan 1961-62 at Test Cricket Tours

1961 in English cricket
1962 in English cricket
1961 in Indian cricket
1962 in Indian cricket
1961 in Pakistani cricket
1962 in Pakistani cricket
1962 in Ceylon
1961-62
1961-62
1962
Indian cricket seasons from 1945–46 to 1969–70
Pakistani cricket seasons from 1947–48 to 1969–70
Sri Lankan cricket seasons from 1880–81 to 1971–72
International cricket competitions from 1960–61 to 1970